Auckland Thistle is a soccer club in New Zealand.

Competed
 1925 Chatham Cup
 1926 Chatham Cup
 1930 Chatham Cup
 1934 Chatham Cup (winner)
 1936 Chatham Cup (runner-up)

Players
 Dennis Smith
 Les Wood
 Cliff Banham
 Murray Kay
 Dick Hislop
 Ron Stone
 George White

Association football clubs in Auckland